Ismaïla Diarra (born 16 January 1992 in Kéniéba, Mali) is a Malian professional footballer who is currently assigned to CA Bordj Bou Arréridj of the Algerian Ligue Professionnelle 1.

Career

Rwanda

Going to Rayon Sports  of the Rwanda National Football League on a six-month contract in February 2016, Diarra renewed his contract with Gikundiro in summer that year after finding the net three times in a 4-0 routing of Bugesera in the domestic league. He then severed ties with Rayon by October before returning to the club in mid-2017.

Kenya

Poised to move to AFC Leopards of the Kenyan Premier League in summer 2016, the Malian striker was said to have signed an official deal with the club and was even registered by the Football Kenya Federation but Rayon Sports were obdurate that he was still their player and had not been officially released. AFC Leopards proceeded to bring the case to FIFA.

References

External links
 at National Football Teams

Malian footballers
Mali international footballers
Living people
Malian expatriate footballers
Expatriate footballers in Rwanda
Azam F.C. players
Expatriate footballers in Egypt
Association football forwards
Expatriate footballers in Morocco
Ismaily SC players
Expatriate footballers in Tanzania
1992 births
Expatriate footballers in the Democratic Republic of the Congo
Chabab Atlas Khénifra players
21st-century Malian people